The Pentium III from Intel is a sixth-generation CPU targeted at the consumer market.

Desktop processors

"Katmai" (250 nm) 

 9.5 million transistors
 All models support: MMX, SSE
 The 'B' suffix denotes a 133 MHz FSB
 The '80525PYxxx512' number denotes an OEM CPU while the 'BX80525xxxx512' or 'BX80525xxxx512E' number denotes a boxed CPU	
 The L2 cache is off-die and runs at 50% CPU speed.

"Coppermine" (180 nm) 

 28 million transistors
 All models support: MMX, SSE
 The 'B' suffix denotes a 133 MHz FSB when the same speed was also available with a 100 MHz FSB.
 The 'E' suffix denotes a processor with support for Intel's Advanced Transfer Cache  in Intel documentation; in reality it indicates a Coppermine core when the same speed was available as either Katmai or Coppermine. The 'E' suffix was not used on speeds faster than Katmai was available on, unless the 'B' suffix was also present; but all Coppermine CPUs have the Advanced Transfer Cache. 
 The L2 cache runs at 100% CPU speed

"Coppermine T" (180 nm) 

 All models support: MMX, SSE
 The L2 cache runs at 100% CPU speed

"Tualatin" (130 nm) 

 All models support: MMX, SSE
 The 'S' suffix denotes the presence of 512 KB L2 cache and dual-processor capability.
 The Tualatin-class Pentium IIIs did not include the controversial Processor Serial Number feature that was present in the earlier Pentium IIIs
 The L2 cache runs at 100% CPU speed
 Tualatin (S) supports up to 4 GB of memory (PC133 MHz ECC SDRAM DIMM - 4x1GB)

Mobile processors

"Coppermine" (180 nm) 

 All models support: MMX, SSE

"Tualatin" (130 nm) 

 All models support: MMX, SSE

Videogame consoles

"Coppermine-128" (180 nm) 

A custom Coppermine-based Pentium III version was developed for Microsoft's Xbox game console. The only significant change was that the chip lost half of its L2 cache, dropping it down to 128 KB. Unlike the Celeron Coppermine-128 variant with the same size L2 cache, but reduced 4-way L2 cache associativity, Xbox's Coppermine core kept all of its 8-way L2 cache associativity from the Pentium III. This means that the Xbox CPU's L2 cache is more efficient than Celeron's. The Xbox CPU was manufactured onto the same Micro-PGA2 packaging as notebook chips, but in a BGA (ball grid array) format. 
 All models support: MMX, SSE
 The L2 cache runs at 100% cpu speed

See also 
 List of Intel Pentium microprocessors

References

External links 
 Intel Automated Relational Knowledgebase
 CPU World sSpec Reference Pentium IIIs

Pentium 3
Intel Pentium 3